Farleigh School is a Catholic preparatory day and boarding school in Andover, Hampshire, England. The current school comprises a pre-prep department (ages 3–6) and the main prep school (ages 6–13).

History
Farleigh was founded as a boys' boarding school in 1953 at Farleigh House, near Basingstoke, Hampshire, the seat of the earls of Portsmouth, by the late Jocelyn Francis Trappes-Lomax. It started out with 35 boys.

Since moving to Red Rice in 1982, the school has acquired an indoor swimming pool, a new art and DT facility, and a new headmaster. Father Simon Everson, in addition to his duties as headmaster at Farleigh School, also takes responsibility as chaplain at the school.

Since 1982 it has been located in a Georgian country house previously named Red Rice House, where the future George IV of the United Kingdom (then still Prince of Wales) was believed to have secretly – and illegally – married the Roman Catholic Maria Anne Fitzherbert in 1785. The legend was disproved in 1905 when Mrs Fitzherbert's papers were made public. The house is situated in the hamlet Red Rice, near Andover, Hampshire.

Boarding
Boarding is available to both boys and girls aged 7 (Year 3) and above. Around 40% of pupils board either full-time or on weekdays. The younger boarders are housed separate sections of the Junior House. Boarders in Year 7 and above reside in two senior houses (1 for boys and 1 for girls).

Notable alumni
 Rupert Allason
 Raymond Asquith, 3rd Earl of Oxford and Asquith
 Rupert Everett
 Alexander Hesketh, 3rd Baron Hesketh
 Earl Jellicoe
 John Home Robertson
 Francis Fitzherbert, 15th Baron Stafford
 Hugh Vyvyan
 Tarka L'Herpiniere
 Cressida Bonas

Former staff
The former Hampshire cricketer and Crystal Palace and Southampton footballer, Bernard Harrison, was for many years a teacher of Mathematics and Sports at the school.

References

External links
School Website
Profile on the ISC website
ISI Inspection Reports

Roman Catholic private schools in the Diocese of Portsmouth
Educational institutions established in 1953
Preparatory schools in Hampshire
Boarding schools in Hampshire
Catholic boarding schools in England
1953 establishments in England
Andover, Hampshire